Romac is a hamlet in the municipality of Pljevlja, Montenegro. It is located close to the Bosnian border.

Demographics
According to the 2003 census, the village had a population of 9 people.

According to the 2011 census, its population was still 9.

References

Populated places in Pljevlja Municipality